East Milwaukie station, also known as Milwaukie, was a short-lived Amtrak train station in Milwaukie, Oregon in service from 1980 to 1981. It was located just east of the intersection of Harrison Street and Highway 224. The station was served by the Willamette Valley and Mount Rainier.

References 

Former Amtrak stations in Oregon
Milwaukie, Oregon
Railway stations in the United States opened in 1980
Railway stations closed in 1981
1980 establishments in Oregon
1981 disestablishments in Oregon